Janīna Kursīte-Pakule (born 2 March 1952, in Arendole) is a Latvian literary scholar, linguist, writer, publicist, and politician. She has served as deputy of the 9th, 10th, 11th, and 12th Saeimas. Kursīte-Pakule is a member of the Latvian Academy of Sciences.

In 2018, after being re-elected to the Saeima, Kursīte-Pakule delivered her oath in Livonian before being asked to retake it in Latvian, which she did in the Livonian dialect of Latvian.

References

1952 births
Living people
People from Vārkava Municipality
For Fatherland and Freedom/LNNK politicians
Civic Union (Latvia) politicians
New Unity politicians
National Alliance (Latvia) politicians
Deputies of the 9th Saeima
Deputies of the 10th Saeima
Deputies of the 11th Saeima
Deputies of the 12th Saeima
Deputies of the 13th Saeima
21st-century Latvian women politicians
Women deputies of the Saeima